Félix Gaillard d'Aimé (
5 November 1919 – 10 July 1970) was a French Radical politician who served as Prime Minister under the Fourth Republic from 1957 to 1958. He was the youngest head of a French government since Napoleon.

Career
A senior civil servant in the Inland Revenue Service, Gaillard joined the Resistance and served on its Finance committee. As a member of the Radical Party, he was elected deputy of Charente département in 1946. During the Fourth Republic, he held a number of governmental offices, notably as Minister of Economy and Finance in 1957.

Prime minister

He became Prime Minister in 1957, but, not unusually for the French Fourth Republic; his term of office lasted only a few months. Gaillard was defeated in a vote of no confidence by the French National Assembly, in March 1958, after the bombing of Sakiet-Sidi-Youssef, a Tunisian village.

Later political career

President of the Radical Party from 1958 to 1961, he advocated an alliance of the center-left and the center-right parties. He represented a generation of young politicians whose careers were blighted by the advent of the Fifth Republic.

Death
Gaillard was last seen alive on 9 July 1970, when he and three passengers boarded his yacht, the Marie Grillon and departed the island of Jersey to return to the French mainland after a brief stay. The next day, bits of the wreckage of the yacht were found at the Minquiers reefs, along with the bodies of the two passengers. Gaillard's body was found, along with that of another passenger, floating in the English Channel on 12 July.

Gaillard's Ministry, 6 November 1957 – 14 May 1958
Félix Gaillard – President of the Council
Christian Pineau – Minister of Foreign Affairs
Jacques Chaban-Delmas – Minister of National Defense and Armed Forces
Maurice Bourgès-Maunoury – Minister of the Interior
Pierre Pflimlin – Minister of Finance, Economic Affairs, and Planning
Paul Ribeyre – Minister of Commerce and Industry
Paul Bacon – Minister of Labour and Social Security
Robert Lecourt – Minister of Justice
René Billères – Minister of National Education, Youth, and Sports
Antoine Quinson – Minister of Veterans and War Victims
Roland Boscary-Monsservin – Minister of Agriculture
Gérard Jaquet – Minister of Overseas France
Édouard Bonnefous – Minister of Public Works, Transport, and Tourism
Félix Houphouët-Boigny – Minister of Public Health and Population
Pierre Garet – Minister of Reconstruction and Housing
Max Lejeune – Minister for the Sahara

References

1919 births
1970 deaths
Deaths due to shipwreck at sea
Deaths from explosion
Deputies of the 1st National Assembly of the French Fifth Republic
Deputies of the 1st National Assembly of the French Fourth Republic
Deputies of the 2nd National Assembly of the French Fifth Republic
Deputies of the 2nd National Assembly of the French Fourth Republic
Deputies of the 3rd National Assembly of the French Fifth Republic
Deputies of the 3rd National Assembly of the French Fourth Republic
Deputies of the 4th National Assembly of the French Fifth Republic
French Ministers of Finance
French people of the Algerian War
Politicians from Paris
Prime Ministers of France
Radical Party (France) politicians